θ Normae, Latinised as Theta Normae, is a binary star system in the constellation Norma. It has an apparent visual magnitude of 5.13 and is visible to the naked eye as a faint, blue-white-hued point of light. At that distance, the visual magnitude of these stars is diminished by an extinction of 0.45 due to interstellar dust.

Chini et al. (2012) identified this as a single-lined spectroscopic binary system. The visible component is a B-type main-sequence star with a stellar classification of B8 V. It is about 17 million tears old and is spinning rapidly with a projected rotational velocity of 251 km/s. The star has 3.6 times the mass of the Sun and 3.05 times the Sun's radius.

References

B-type main-sequence stars
Spectroscopic binaries
Circumstellar disks

Norma (constellation)
Normae, Theta
145842
079653
6045
Durchmusterung objects